Fortunato "Atoy" Gan Co Jr. (born October 15, 1951) is a Filipino former basketball player and coach who played 13 seasons in the Philippine Basketball Association, mostly with Crispa Redmanizers. Nicknamed "The Fortune Cookie" (a pun on his name and ethnicity) during his playing days, he was notable for his trademark turnaround fadeaway jump shot. He is also a former politician and actor.

Collegiate and amateur career
Co joined the Mapúa Cardinals in 1970 and played for the Mapúa team for three years. He was named the Most Valuable Player (MVP) during his first two years. He also brought his wares with the old Crispa team in the MICAA.

Professional career
Co first played in the PBA on April 22, 1975, scoring 34 points and leading Crispa to a 113-102 win over CFC, the team's first victory after starting the season with three straight defeats.

During his PBA stint, he played for the two-time grand slam champion Crispa Redmanizers from 1975 to 1984, with him as one of the team's top scorers. In 1976, he received the All-Filipino Sports Award for Basketball.

Post-PBA career

Acting career
Co ventured into television and films after his playing days were over, first as a co-host for the noontime show Student Canteen over at RPN (now Solar TV), and started alongside action stars like Phillip Salvador in films such as Delima Gang in 1989. He made a career mostly out of playing supporting roles in films and television series.

Politics and other interests
Co became a politician when he served as a long-time city councilor of Pasig from 1998 to 2007. In 2010, he ran again as councilor and was successful in his reelection bid.

He also operated a sports bar named Atoy's at Metrowalk, Pasig.

Coaching career
In 1989, Co became the coach of the Crispa 400 in the PABL, leading the team to two titles in 1990 and 1991.

He served as the head coach of his alma mater, the Mapúa Cardinals, from 2012 to 2018.

Commissioning career
In 2013, Co became the first commissioner of the UNTV Cup, which is the first charity basketball league dedicated for public servants in the Philippines, an original concept by "Mr. Public Service" Daniel Razon.

Coaching record

Collegiate record

Filmography

References

1951 births
Living people
Asian Games competitors for the Philippines
Basketball players from Metro Manila
Basketball players at the 1974 Asian Games
Crispa Redmanizers players
Filipino men's basketball players
Filipino sportsperson-politicians
Great Taste Coffee Makers players
Manila Beer Brewmasters players
Metro Manila city and municipal councilors
Mapúa Cardinals basketball players
People from Pasig
Philippines men's national basketball team players
Point guards
Shooting guards